Lauri Ingman's first cabinet was the third Government of independent Finland and the first to be officially designated as Government (valtioneuvosto) instead of Senate (senaatti). The cabinet's time period lasted from November 27, 1918 to April 17, 1919, following the surrender of Germany and the consequent republican transformation of the Finnish form of state.

Assembly 
The following table displays the Government's composition:

References 

Ingman, 1
1918 establishments in Finland
1919 disestablishments in Finland
Cabinets established in 1918
Cabinets disestablished in 1919